Yercaud taluk is a taluk of Salem district of the Indian state of Tamil Nadu. The headquarters of the taluk is the town of Yercaud.

Demographics
According to the 2011 census, the taluk of Yercaud had a population of 41,832 with 21,047  males and 20,785 females. There were 988 women for every 1000 men. The taluk had a literacy rate of 56.38. Child population in the age group below 6 was 2,214 Males and 2,117 Females.

References 

Taluks of Salem district